Cuarius, also Latinised as Curalius, Cuerius, or Coralius, was a river of ancient Thessaly. It is noted by Strabo as flowing past the ancient cities of Cierium and Iton.

References

Geography of ancient Thessaly
Rivers of Greece